Cedarview is a ghost town in eastern Duchesne County, Utah, United States,

Description
The former community is located just off (west) of Utah State Route 121, about midway between Roosevelt and Neola. There is a cemetery in the former community, that operated until 1936; many babies who died of pneumonia are buried there. A few locals from nearby towns are preserving the cemetery from natural threats like erosion.

History
Cedarview was founded in 1912 when travelers needed a rest stop during a snowstorm. The town was short-lived and never got a post office.

See also

 List of ghost towns in Utah

References

External links

Ghost towns in Utah
Ghost towns in Duchesne County, Utah
Populated places established in 1912